Cleora alienaria is a moth of the family Geometridae first described by Francis Walker in 1860. It is found in Sri Lanka, the Indian subregion to the Andaman Islands, Thailand, Sundaland, Taiwan, and Lesser Sundas as far east as Timor and Christmas Island.

Adults are polymorphic and show clear color differences; this leads to confusion of classification. The discal spot of the forewing is clearly defined. The caterpillar is a leafy green color with fine linear marbling. There is a narrow, lenticular, transverse white bar anterior to dorsolateral brown tubercles. This white bar is divided centrally by a black triangle. The caterpillar is known to feed on Falcataria moluccana, Acacia mangium, Cinnamomum, Sambucus, and Dalbergia monetaria.

Three subspecies are recognized.
Cleora alienaria fumipennis Prout, 1929 - Christmas Islands
Cleora alienaria gelidaria Walker, 1863
Cleora alienaria rasanaria Swinhoe, 1915

References

External links
A molecular phylogeny of the Palaearctic and Oriental members of the tribe Boarmiini

Moths of Asia
Moths described in 1860